Verginità is a 1951 Italian melodrama film written and directed by Leonardo De Mitri.

Plot
A country girl who is a diligent devourer of picture stories, decides to participate in a beauty contest without the consent of her father. She dreams of a glamorous career in the big city. When she loses the contest, she is approached by two men who offer her a modeling job. However, they are in fact human traffickers who intend to lure her to Brazil.

Cast
Irene Genna as Gina
Leonardo Cortese as Franco Rossi
Franca Marzi as Giulia
Otello Toso as Giancarlo
Eleonora Rossi Drago as Mara Sibilia
Arnoldo Foà as René
Tamara Lees as Lidia
Checco Durante as Mr. Corelli 
Guglielmo Barnabò as Impresario 
Mario Siletti   
Mario Ferrari

References

External links
 

1951 films
1950s Italian-language films
Films directed by Leonardo De Mitri
Films about beauty pageants
Italian drama films
Melodrama films
Italian black-and-white films
1951 drama films
1950s Italian films